Ray Wolfe (September 23, 1905 – October 5, 1977) was Mayor of Anchorage, Alaska from 1944 to 1945.

Biography
Ray G. Wolfe was born September 23, 1905, in West Liberty, Iowa. He moved to Alaska in January 1927 to work for his uncle in a sheet metal shop at the intersection of Fifth Avenue and C Street. In the years to follow, he purchased the business and converted it into Wolfe's Department Store.

Wolfe was elected to a single term as Mayor of Anchorage in 1944. In 1960, he ran a failed campaign for a seat in the Alaska Senate as a Republican.

In 1972, Wolfe sold the department store to his nephew, Jerry Wolf, who renamed it Wolf's Home Furnishings.

Wolfe died the morning of October 5, 1977 at Providence Hospital in Anchorage.

References

 

1905 births
1977 deaths
Alaska Republicans
People from Muscatine County, Iowa
Mayors of Anchorage, Alaska
20th-century American politicians